Ranger Red's Zoo & Conservation Park, formerly Peel Zoo, is a zoo and wildlife sanctuary located on the banks of the Murray River in Pinjarra, Western Australia. It is a member of the Zoo and Aquarium Association.

It is home to over 100 native and exotic animal species, and specializes in being a "hands-on" zoo. Patrons can feed the animals by hand and interact with animals such as snakes, rufous bettong and ferrets. The park features other animals including koalas, wombats, dingoes, birds, reptiles, and kangaroos.

History
The zoo was originally called Peel Zoo. In 2012, three Tasmanian devils escaped, making the national news.

In 2017, Narelle MacPherson and David Cobbold moved from Peel Zoo to take over the Warrawong Sanctuary in the Adelaide Hills in South Australia.

In August 2019 the zoo was rebranded as Ranger Red's Zoo and Conservation Park after being taken over by Bradley Holland, also known as "Ranger Red". Holland was inspired in his youth by Harry Butler and Gerald Durrell.

Animals

The animal species (including some sub-species of certain species) include:

Amphibians

 Dumpy tree frog
 Magnificent tree frog

Birds

 Alexandrine parakeet
 Australian kestrel
 Australian king parrot
 Australian magpie
 Australian ringneck parrot (Twenty-eight parrot)
 Australian wood duck
 Banded lapwing
 Bar-shouldered dove
 Barbary dove
 Barking owl
 Bleeding-heart dove
 Blue-and-gold macaw
 Blue-faced honeyeater
 Blue peafowl
 Brown quail
 Brush bronzewing
 Budgerigar
 Buff-banded rail
 Bush thick-knee stone-curlew
 Cattle egret
 Chestnut-eared finch
 Cockatiel
 Common canary
 Crested pigeon
 Crimson rosella
 Crimson-backed forest finch
 Diamond dove
 Diamond firetail finch
 Domestic chicken (Bantam breeds)
 Eastern barn owl
 Eastern rosella
 Eclectus parrot
 Egyptian goose
 European goldfinch
 Galah
 Glossy ibis
 Golden pheasant
 Gouldian finch
 Grey butcherbird
 Grey goshawk
 Hooded parrot
 Japanese quail
 Java sparrow
 King quail
 Lady Amherst's pheasant
 Laughing kookaburra
 Little corella
 Long-billed corella
 Long-tailed finch
 Major Mitchell's cockatoo
 Masked lapwing
 Mountain shelduck
 Moustached parakeet
 Musk lorikeet
 Nankeen night heron
 Pacific black duck
 Painted finch
 Peaceful dove
 Peach-faced lovebird
 Princess parrot
 Rainbow lorikeet
 Red-capped parrot
 Red-collared lorikeet
 Red junglefowl
 Red-rumped parrot
 Red-tailed black cockatoo
 Reeve's pheasant
 Regent parrot
 Royal spoonbill
 Scaly-breasted lorikeet
 Scarlet-chested parrot
 Silver pheasant
 Sooty owl
 Southern boobook owl
 Spur-winged plover
 Sulphur-crested cockatoo
 Superb parrot
 Tawny frogmouth
 Varied lorikeet
 Wandering whistling duck
 Weaver finch
 Western rosella 
 White-tailed black cockatoo

Mammals

 Alpaca
 Arabian camel
 Bare-nosed wombat
 Common brushtail possum
 Common ringtail possum
 Dingo
 Domestic ferret
 Domestic guinea pig
 Domestic goat
 Domestic rabbit
 Domestic sheep
 Euro wallaroo
 Grey-headed flying fox
 Koala
 Red-bellied pademelon 
 Red deer
 Red kangaroo
 Rufous bettong
 Shetland pony
 Short-beaked echidna
 Southern hairy-nosed wombat
 Spotted-tailed quoll
 Squirrel glider
 Sugar glider
 Swamp wallaby
 Tasmanian devil
 Western grey kangaroo
 Woylie bettong

Reptiles

 Banded rock python
 Black-headed python
 Bobtail lizard
 Centralian blue-tongued lizard
 Common death adder
 Dugite
 Eastern blue-tongued lizard
 Frill-neck lizard
 King's skink
 Mertens' water monitor
 Northern blue-tongued lizard
 Oblong turtle
 Olive Python
 Rough knob-tailed gecko
 South-western carpet python
 Steindachner's flat-shell turtle
 Western bearded dragon
 Western blue-tongued lizard
 Western tiger snake
 Woma python

Note: some wild species of water birds also occupy the zoo's waterways. Displays for a number of arachnids and insects too include giant prickly stick insect and barking tarantula.

References

External links

Zoos in Western Australia
Wildlife parks in Australia